The 2015 IIHF U18 World Championship Division III was a pair of international under-18 ice hockey tournaments organised by the International Ice Hockey Federation. The Division III A and Division III B tournaments represent the sixth and the seventh tier of the IIHF World U18 Championship.

Division III A
The Division III A tournament was played in Taipei City, Taiwan, from 22 to 28 March 2015.

Participants

Standings

Results

All times are local. (National Standard Time – UTC+8)

Division III B
The Division III B tournament was played in Auckland, New Zealand, from 17 to 19 March 2015.

Participants

Standings

Results
All times are local. (New Zealand Daylight Time – UTC+13)

See also
 List of sporting events in Taiwan

References

IIHF World U18 Championship Division III
2015 IIHF World U18 Championships
2015 in New Zealand sport
International ice hockey competitions hosted by New Zealand